Susanne Erbers is a former West German slalom canoeist who competed from the mid-1970s to the mid-1980s.

She won a gold medal in the K-1 team event at the 1981 ICF Canoe Slalom World Championships in Bala.

References
Overview of athlete's results at canoeslalom.net 

West German female canoeists
Possibly living people
Year of birth missing (living people)
Medalists at the ICF Canoe Slalom World Championships